This article lists the statutory retirement age in different countries.

Background
In some contexts, the retirement age is the age at which a person is expected or required to cease work. It is usually the age at which such a person may be entitled to receive superannuation or other government benefits, like a state pension. The first recorded use of a state pension was in 13 BC by Augustus Caesar for military veterans who had served for at least 16 years in a legion and 4 years in the reserves, though this would later be increased to 20 years in a legion and 5 years in the reserves. Historically, states lack a retirement age even though labor force participation rates began to fall dramatically after the age of 60. The first retirement age was set at 70 in Germany by Otto Von Bismarck in 1881, before being reduced to 65 in 1916. Following this, more countries began to adopt an official retirement age, such as with Britain with the passage of the Old Age Pensions Act 1908 which set the initial retirement age at 70 before being reduced to 65 for men and 60 for women with the passage of the National Insurance Act 1946. The United States adopted an initial retirement age of 65 with the Social Security Act of 1935. By the mid-20th century, almost all countries had adopted a retirement age. 

In the present day, policymakers usually consider the demography, fiscal cost of aging, health, life expectancy, nature of the profession, supply of labor force, etc. while taking the retirement age into account. The increase in life expectancy is used in some jurisdictions as an argument to increase the age of retirement in the 21st century.

Retirement age by country and region

Many of the countries listed in the table below are in the process of reforming retirement ages (see the notes in the table for details). The ages show when an individual retires if they retire / have retired in the year given in the table. The trend in some countries is that in future, the retirement age will increase gradually (where available, explanations are given in the section on notes); therefore one's year of birth determines the age of retirement (eg in Romania,  women born in January 1955 had their retirement age in January 2015 at age 60; those born in January 1958 would retire in January 2019 at age 61; those born in January 1961 will retire in January 2023 at age 62; those born in January 1967 will retire in January 2030 at age 63).

The average of statutory retirement age in the 34 countries of the Organisation for Economic Co-operation and Development (OECD) in 2014 was: males 65 years and females 63.5 years, but the tendency all over the world is to increase the retirement age. This is also reflected by the findings that just over half the Asian investors surveyed region-wide said they agreed with raising the retirement age, with a quarter disagreeing and the remainder undecided.

Reform 
Reforms tend to be phased in slowly when the retirement age (or pension age) is increased with grandfathering, ensuring a gradual change. In contrast, when the age of retirement is decreased, changes are often brought about rapidly.

One of such examples of grandfathering is the transitional pension rules, which were applied for staff aged 54 years or older, and to some extent, for all staff in place, when in 2014, the retirement age of European civil servants was increased to 66 years of age.

Men retire either later than women or at the same time. This is being addressed in some countries, where the retirement ages are being equalized.

See also 
 Pension
 Retirement
 Retirement in Europe
 Mandatory retirement
 History of retirement

References

External links 
 Only three other countries in the EU plan to increase retirement age above 65

Age
Age and society